Bollin is a surname. Notable people with the surname include: 

Ann Bollin (born 1960), American politician
Zuzu Bollin (1923–1990), American blues guitarist

See also 

 Boleyn

Surnames
English-language surnames
Surnames of English origin
Surnames of British Isles origin